Chulsanbaatar is a genus of mammal from the Cretaceous of Mongolia. It lived during the Mesozoic, also known as the "age of the dinosaurs."  This small creature was a member of the extinct order of Multituberculata and is within the suborder Cimolodonta. The genus Chulsanbaatar was named by Kielan-Jaworowska Z. in 1974.

Fossil remains of the species Chulsanbaatar vulgaris have been found in strata dating to the Campanian (Upper Cretaceous) in the Red Beds of Hermiin Tsav (also known as Khermeen Tsav, part of the Barun Goyot Formation) in Mongolia.

This creature was a small multituberculate with a 2 cm skull. The jaw would fit on a fingertip. Remarkably, it has been possible to study the ear bones, which shows how well some of the fossils are preserved. Chulsanbaatar is now a resident of the Polish Academy of Science in Warsaw, Poland. (e.g. ZPAL MgM-1/84). There are a fair number of specimens in the collection, which doubtless accounts for the species name (vulgaris = common).

References 
 Kielan-Jaworowska (1974), "Multituberculate succession in the Late Cretaceous of the Gobi Desert (Mongolia)". Palaeontologica Polonica 30, p. 23-44.
 Kielan-Jaworowska Z & Hurum JH (2001), "Phylogeny and Systematics of multituberculate mammals". Paleontology 44, p. 389-429.
 Much of this information has been derived from   MESOZOIC MAMMALS; Djadochtatherioidea, an Internet directory.

Cimolodonts
Santonian life
Campanian life
Late Cretaceous mammals of Asia
Fossils of Mongolia
Fossil taxa described in 1974
Prehistoric mammal genera